The 1962 Valley State Matadors football team represented San Fernando Valley State College—now known as California State University, Northridge—as a member of the California Collegiate Athletic Association (CCAA) during the 1962 NCAA College Division football season. This was the first year the school played a varsity football schedule. Led by first-year head coach Sam Winningham, Valley State compiled an overall record of 3–6 with a mark of 2–3 in conference play, placing fifth in the CCAA. The Matadors played home games at Monroe High School in Sepulveda, California.

Schedule

Notes

References

Valley State
Cal State Northridge Matadors football seasons
Valley State Matadors football